Dino Rora (5 March 1945 – 28 January 1966) was an Italian swimmer who competed in the 1964 Summer Olympics.

He died in the Lufthansa Flight 005 crash in Bremen, Germany.

References

1945 births
1966 deaths
Italian male swimmers
Italian male backstroke swimmers
Olympic swimmers of Italy
Swimmers at the 1964 Summer Olympics
Victims of aviation accidents or incidents in Germany
Mediterranean Games gold medalists for Italy
Mediterranean Games medalists in swimming
Swimmers at the 1963 Mediterranean Games
Victims of aviation accidents or incidents in 1966
20th-century Italian people